The Cathedral of St. Joseph  is a Catholic cathedral in St. Joseph, Missouri, United States.  Along with the Cathedral of the Immaculate Conception in Kansas City, Missouri it is the seat of the Diocese of Kansas City-St. Joseph.  The Cathedral Church, rectory and convent are all contributing properties to the Cathedral Hill Historic District on the National Register of Historic Places.  The school building and the auditorium do not contribute to the historical nature of the district.

History

St. Joseph Parish
Joseph Robidoux  settled the area that is now the city of St. Joseph in 1826.  The Rev. Pierre-Jean De Smet, SJ was the first priest to visit the area in 1838.  He met with Robidoux and expressed his desire to establish a chapel in his settlement.  The first Mass in the settlement was said by another Jesuit missionary the same year in Robidoux's log house.  The Jesuits continued to visit the area between 1838 and 1845.  Robidoux platted the town of St. Joseph in 1843.

The Rev. Thomas Scanlan arrived in St. Joseph of October 15, 1845, and began plans to build a church.  He had a  brick church built on the northeast corner of Fifth and Felix Streets.  Archbishop Peter Richard Kenrick of St. Louis dedicated the church, named St. Joseph's Church, on June 17, 1847.  The parish had 20 families at the time.  Father Scanlan died in 1860 and was replaced by the Rev. John Hennessy who served the parish until he was named thirdBishop of Dubuque in 1893.

Cathedral of St. Joseph
On March 3, 1868 Pope Pius IX established the Diocese of St. Joseph.  St. Joseph's Church became the new diocese's cathedral.  Bishop John J. Hogan bought property at the corner of Tenth and Isadore Streets to build the present cathedral.  The cornerstone was laid on September 12, 1869.  The construction of the cathedral was slow due to continuing budget shortfalls.  This may have been partly due to the Panic of 1873.  Several prominent parishioners connected with the St. Joseph Improvement Company sponsored a raffle of real estate in the cathedral neighborhood to raise funds.  The raffle involved 60 lots valued between $200 to $500, with tickets offered at $3 each.  Ticket sales were slower than expected and the drawing was delayed from November 22, 1870, to April 10, 1871.  The cathedral was not finished according to its original designs.  When the first Mass was celebrated on March 17, 1871, the interior had yet to be plastered and the stained glass windows were not installed and construction continued to 1883.    The old church was eventually demolished and the property was sold with the proceeds helping fund construction of the new cathedral.

The Rev. Ignatius Conrad, O.S.B became the Rector in 1876 and served the parish until he was named the Abbot of Subiaco Abbey in Subiaco, Arkansas.  The rectory was built in 1893, when the Rev. Andrew Newman was rector.  The parish's priest up to this time had lived in an apartment in the church.  The rectory was also used as the chancery for the diocese.

Bishop Maurice F. Burke oversaw the renovation of the cathedral in 1900.  The two towers were built as was a portico entrance according to the original plans.

In 1924, the Rev. Leo Ruggle came to the cathedral as associate pastor.  He was the diocesan chancellor from 1926 to 1936, served as the Rector from 1937 to 1964 and then became Rector-emeritus until his death in 1984.  He was the Diocesan Administrator from 1961 to 1962.  A year before he died the renovated church basement was named in his honor.

On August 29, 1956, Pope Pius XII merged the Diocese of St. Joseph with the Diocese of Kansas City to form the Diocese of Kansas City-St. Joseph.  The eastern half of the St. Joseph Diocese became part of the newly established Diocese of Jefferson City and the southern half of the Diocese of Kansas City became part of the newly established Diocese of Springfield Cape Girardeau.  The Diocese of Kansas City-St. Joseph has Co-Cathedrals: The Cathedral of the Immaculate Conception in Kansas City and the Cathedral of St. Joseph.

The Cathedral of St. Joseph was renovated from 1969 to 1970 following the liturgical reforms of the Second Vatican Council.  Other renovations were completed in 1981 and 1995.  The parish opened a food pantry in the 1980s.

Catholic schools
In the 1850s Religious of the Sacred Heart and the Christian Brothers came to St. Joseph and opened schools.  The Daughters of Charity of St. Vincent de Paul came to St. Joseph in 1869 and began to operate a school and a hospital.  From 1891 to the 1980s they operated St. Joseph's Hospital.

The Religious of the Sacred Heart opened St. Joseph's first parochial school in 1901.  They were replaced by the Benedictine Sisters of Mt. St. Scholastica in 1920.  Christian Brothers High School, now Bode Middle School, was built during the episcopate of Bishop Francis Gilfillan.   The school building was renovated in 1954 and a combination gymnasium and auditorium was built in 1958.  It was named in honor of Msgr. Charles Nowland.  Pre-school was added in 1981.  By the late 1980s the faculty was composed of all lay people.  The convent was turned into a day care center and now houses the Cathedral Early Childhood Center.

Architecture
The cathedral is a brick masonry building designed in the Romanesque Revival style by Patrick F. Meagher.  He would later design the Buchanan County Courthouse.  It features a transept, two corner towers on the main façade with pyramidal roofs.  The narthex, featuring three entrance doors was added in 1956.  The rectory is a three–story brick structure.  "The facade features three-story, projecting box bay and side, two-story, projecting polygonal bays."  The L-shaped porch is supported by Romanesque-style columns.  The auditorium features Art Deco elements on its design from the 1950s.  The convent is influenced by the Colonial Revival style.  It features a hipped roof and an entrance portico with Doric columns and capitals.  The school building is similar in style with the convent.  It is a two-story brick building that at-one-time had a third floor that has since been removed.

Pastors/ Rectors
The following priests have served as pastors of St. Joseph's parish and after 1868 as the cathedral rector:

Rev. Thomas Scanlan (1845–1860)
Rev. John Hennessy (1860–1866)
Rev. James Doherty (1866–1868)
Bishop John J. Hogan (1868–1876)
Rev. Ignatius Conrad, O.S.B. (1876–1892)
Rev. Andrew Newman (1892–1893)
Bishop M. F. Burke (1893–1913)
Rev. John J. O’Neill (1913–1923)
Rev. Maurice F. Connor (1923–1926)
Rev. Charles F. Buddy (1926–1937)
Msgr. Leo J. Ruggle (1937–1964)
Msgr. Charles S. Nowland (1964–1973)
Msgr. Robert J. Hogan (1973–1979)
Rev. Gerald R. Waris (1979–1986)
Rev. Patrick Tobin (1986–1988)
Rev. Thomas J. D. Hawkins (1988–1995)
Rev. Wayne L. Walter (1995–1996)
Msgr. Richard M. Dierkes (1996–2008)
Rev. Joseph B. Powers (2008–2012)
Rev. Matthew Rotert (2012–2018)
Rev. Stephen Hansen (2018–Present)

See also
List of Catholic cathedrals in the United States
List of cathedrals in the United States

References

External links
 Cathedral Website
Diocese of Kansas City-St. Joseph Website

Churches in the Roman Catholic Diocese of Kansas City–Saint Joseph
Religious organizations established in 1845
Roman Catholic churches completed in 1871
Joseph (St. Joseph, Missouri)
Buildings and structures in St. Joseph, Missouri
Romanesque Revival church buildings in Missouri
Tourist attractions in Buchanan County, Missouri
Historic district contributing properties in Missouri
1845 establishments in Missouri
Churches on the National Register of Historic Places in Missouri
19th-century Roman Catholic church buildings in the United States